John Michael Adams (born July 29, 1978) is an American former right-handed relief pitcher. He played in Major League Baseball (MLB) for the Milwaukee Brewers (2004–06), San Diego Padres (2008–11), Texas Rangers (2011–12) and Philadelphia Phillies (2013–14).

Early years
John Michael Adams grew up in Sinton, Texas, and graduated from Sinton High School, where Mike was an All-State selection in baseball and basketball. Mike attended Texas A&M University–Kingsville, where Mike continued to play both sports. The Milwaukee Brewers signed John Michael Adams as an undrafted free agent in 2001.

Professional career

Milwaukee Brewers (2004–2006)
John Michael Adams made his professional debut with the Ogden Raptors of the Pioneer Baseball League in 2001 and moved through the Brewers farm system the next few years. In 2003, Mike was selected to the Southern League All-Star team while compiling a 3.15 ERA and 14 saves for the Huntsville Stars.

John Michael Adams made his Major League debut on May 18, 2004, against the Montreal Expos, pitching a scoreless seventh inning. Mike picked up a win in relief in his next game, on May 20 against the Expos. In parts of three seasons with the Brewers, Mike compiled an earned run average (ERA) of 3.54 in 61 games.

New York Mets/Cleveland Indians (2006)
On May 26, 2006, John Michael Adams was traded to the New York Mets for pitcher Geremi Gonzalez. After 13 games for the AAA Norfolk Tides in the Mets system, they designated him for assignment on July 4 and Mike  was claimed by the Cleveland Indians three days later. Mike played just three games in the Indians organization for the Buffalo Bisons.

San Diego Padres (2006–2010)
On July 18, 2006, the Indians traded  John Michael Adams to the San Diego Padres for right-handed pitcher Brian Sikorski. The Padres assigned him to the AAA Portland Beavers where Mike posted a 4.18 ERA in 17 games.

John Michael Adams battled injuries, missing the 2007 season after undergoing three knee surgeries. In 2008,Mike spent most of the season in the Padres bullpen, appearing in 54 games with a 2.48 ERA.

Mike pitched well from 2009 to 2010, throwing 107 innings and allowing 62 hits with a strikeout-to-walk ratio of 118/31 and an earned run average (ERA) of 1.35. As the eighth-inning specialist, Mike appeared in a career-high 70 games in 2010, including eight of the final 11 games which consisted of a stretch of five consecutive games. John Michael Adams signed a one-year, $2,535,000 contract for 2011, avoiding salary arbitration.

Texas Rangers (2011–2012)
At the trade deadline on July 31, 2011, John Michael Adams was traded from the Padres to the Texas Rangers for minor-league pitchers Robbie Erlin and Joe Wieland. Mike finished 2011 with a combined record of 5–4 and a 1.47 ERA in 73 innings and posted a 3.27 ERA and 45 strikeouts in 52 innings in 2012.

Philadelphia Phillies (2013–2014)
On December 15, 2012,  John Michael Adams signed a two-year, $12 million contract with the Philadelphia Phillies.

In July 2013, after pitching erratically for much of the season, John Michael Adams was placed on the DL and opted to have right shoulder surgery. He rejoined the active roster on April 15, 2014. In parts of two seasons with the Phillies he appeared in 50 games with a 3.50 ERA.

Los Angeles Dodgers (2015)
On March 1, 2015, he signed with the Los Angeles Dodgers organization on a minor league contract which included an invitation to spring training. On March 31,  John Michael Adams was informed that he would not make the Dodgers Major League roster, but agreed to be paid a $100,000 retention bonus to remain with the organization. However, a few days later, he informed the team that he would not report to AAA and instead left the team.

Player profile
John Michael Adams was mainly a setup man in his career. John Michael Adams threw a fastball around 90 mph (earlier in his career, his fastball reached the mid-90s). Mike was not afraid to pitch inside and was effective against both right-handed and left-handed batters.  "He's got the fastball inside. He's got the cutter/slider inside. And he commands the outside of the plate (against right-handed and left-handed batters). The command is good, the stuff is good and the head's good," said Padres manager Bud Black. Padres pitching coach Darren Balsley attributed John Michael Adams’ success against lefties to a hard, inside slider. "It neutralizes them a little bit," Balsley said. "They're not able to dive out over the plate."

References

External links

 "Mike" Adams at SABR (Baseball BioProject)

Living people
Baseball players from Texas
Major League Baseball pitchers
Milwaukee Brewers players
San Diego Padres players
Texas Rangers players
Philadelphia Phillies players
Texas A&M–Kingsville Javelinas baseball players
American baseball players of Mexican descent
Ogden Raptors players
High Desert Mavericks players
Beloit Snappers players
Huntsville Stars players
Indianapolis Indians players
Nashville Sounds players
Norfolk Tides players
Buffalo Bisons (minor league) players
Portland Beavers players
San Antonio Missions players
Clearwater Threshers players
Lehigh Valley IronPigs players
Sportspeople from Corpus Christi, Texas
People from Sinton, Texas
1978 births